Maxence is a French name, derived from the Latin Maxentius. As a first name, it is given to males.

People

Surname
Edgar Maxence, a French symbolist painter
Jean-Pierre Maxence, a French non-conformist writer

Middle name
Ange Hyacinthe Maxence, baron de Damas (1785–1862), French general and minister 
Jean Maxence Berrou (born 1985), French modern pentathlete
Louis Henri Maxence Bertrand Rainier III, full name of Rainier III, Prince of Monaco

First name
Maxence Bibié (1891-1950), French politician
Maxence Boitez (born 1990), French musician, known professionally as Ridsa
Maxence Carlier (born 1997), French footballer
Maxence Caron (born 1976), French writer and philosopher 
Maxence Caqueret (born 2000), French professional footballer
Maxence Cyrin, French pianist and composer
Maxence Danet-Fauvel (born 1993), French actor and model
Maxence Derrien (born 1993), French footballer
Maxence Flachez (born 1972), French football defender
Maxence Lacroix (born 2000), French footballer
Maxence Larrieu (born 1934), French classical flautist   
Maxence Layet (born 1971), French journalist and author 
Maxence Mailfort (born 1949), French film and television actor
Maxence Muzaton (born 1990), French alpine ski racer 
Maxence Parrot (born 1994), Canadian snowboarder
Maxence Perrin (born 1955), French actor
Maxence Prévot (born 1997), French footballer 
Maxence Van der Meersch, French Flemish writer

Places
Canton of Pont-Sainte-Maxence, France
Pont-Sainte-Maxence, a commune in the Oise department in northern France
Gare de Pont-Sainte-Maxence, railway station serving Pont-Sainte-Maxence

French masculine given names
French-language surnames